Alejandro DeJesus Mejia (born January 18, 1991) is an American professional baseball infielder for the Acereros de Monclova of the Mexican League. He played college baseball for the Arizona Wildcats, winning the 2012 College World Series. He has played in Major League Baseball (MLB) for the St. Louis Cardinals.

Career

Amateur career
Mejia attended El Camino Real High School in Woodland Hills, California, and the University of Arizona. Playing college baseball for the Arizona Wildcats, Mejia became the team's starting shortstop as a freshman. He was named the 2012 Pac-12 Conference Baseball Player of the Year, and was a member of the 2012 College World Series champions.

St Louis Cardinals
The St. Louis Cardinals selected Mejia in the fourth round, with the 150th overall selection, of the 2012 MLB draft. He signed with the Cardinals, receiving a $250,000 signing bonus, and made his professional debut with the Batavia Muckdogs of the Class A-Short Season New York–Penn League. He tore his anterior cruciate ligament during a July 31 game with the Muckdogs. Mejia played for the Peoria Chiefs of the Class A Midwest League and the Palm Beach Cardinals of the Class A-Advanced Florida State League in 2013. He began the 2014 season with Palm Beach, and was promoted to the Springfield Cardinals of the Class AA Texas League in July. He began the 2015 season with Springfield, and was promoted to the Memphis Redbirds of the Class AAA Pacific Coast League during the season.

Mejia began the 2017 season with Springfield, and was promoted to Memphis. On June 28, the Cardinals promoted Mejia to the major leagues. He made his debut the following day, against the Arizona Diamondbacks, when he started at second base and batted eighth, where he went 0-for-2 before being pinch hit for. He had first major league hit and home run against the Washington Nationals on July 1, 2017. He was outrighted to Memphis on November 6, 2017.

Mejia spent all of 2018 with Memphis, compiling a .273 batting average with four home runs and 35 RBIs in 108 games. He helped lead Memphis to the 2018 Triple-A National Championship Game, where they defeated the Durham Bulls 14-4. Mejia was named the MVP of the game after going five-for-five with five RBIs. He elected free agency on November 2, 2018.

Acereros de Monclova
On January 24, 2019, Mejia signed with the Acereros de Monclova of the Mexican League for the 2019 season. Mejia did not play in a game in 2020 due to the cancellation of the Mexican League season because of the COVID-19 pandemic.

Personal life
Mejia's father, Carlo, was named an All-American while playing college baseball for Pepperdine University in 1975, and played professionally in the Mexican League. Mejia has three siblings; his two older sisters and his cousin, played college softball for Long Island University.

References

External links

1991 births
Living people
People from Sylmar, Los Angeles
Baseball players from Los Angeles
Major League Baseball infielders
Mexican League baseball infielders
St. Louis Cardinals players
Acereros de Monclova players
Arizona Wildcats baseball players
Batavia Muckdogs players
Peoria Chiefs players
Palm Beach Cardinals players
Springfield Cardinals players
Memphis Redbirds players
El Camino Real High School alumni
American baseball players of Mexican descent
American expatriate baseball players in Mexico